The 2005 Angola Basketball Super Cup (12th edition) was contested by Primeiro de Agosto, as the 2004 league champion and Petro Atlético, the 2004 cup winner. Primeiro de Agosto was the winner, making its 5th title.

The 2005 Women's Super Cup (10th edition) was contested by Primeiro de Agosto, as the 2004 women's league champion and Interclube, the 2004 cup runner-up. Primeiro de Agosto was the winner, making it is's 2nd title.

2005 Men's Super Cup

2005 Women's Super Cup

See also
 2005 Angola Basketball Cup
 2005 BAI Basket

References

Angola Basketball Super Cup seasons
Super Cup